China Eastern Airlines Flight 5735 was a scheduled domestic passenger flight in China from Kunming to Guangzhou. On 21 March 2022, the Boeing 737-89P aircraft operating the service descended steeply mid-flight and struck the ground at high speed in Teng County, Wuzhou, Guangxi Zhuang Autonomous Region, killing all 123 passengers and 9 crew members.   Multiple reports say that the airplane was deliberately crashed, but the official investigation by the National Transportation Safety Board (NTSB) and Civil Aviation Administration of China (CAAC) is ongoing. It is the third deadliest air crash in China after China Southern Airlines Flight 3943 and China Northwest Airlines Flight 2303, the deadliest air accident in China Eastern Airlines' history, and the deadliest plane crash in 2022.

Flight 

The aircraft departed Kunming Changshui International Airport for Guangzhou Baiyun International Airport at 13:15 CST (05:15 UTC) and was scheduled to land at 15:05 (07:05 UTC). The aircraft had been scheduled to travel earlier from Baoshan to Kunming, but this segment of the journey was temporarily suspended due to low passenger numbers as a result of the COVID-19 pandemic in mainland China.

Contact with the aircraft was lost over the city of Wuzhou. The aircraft crashed in the mountainous regions of Teng County causing a fire in nearby vegetation.

Some information channels such as Kunming Changshui International Airport and Umetrip temporarily showed that flight had arrived due to not registering the flight's loss of contact. Others showed "loss of contact", "unknown," or a blanked-out status.

Residents of the villages surrounding the crash site heard a loud explosion.  The final descent and crash was filmed by a security camera at the premises of a local mining company. The video showed the plane in a near vertical dive seconds before it hits the ground.  Footage from the crash site showed wreckage and a fire. Many smaller pieces of wreckage were scattered in the surrounding area. All of the plane's occupants died. It was the first fatal crash involving China Eastern Airlines since November 2004's Flight 5210.

Aircraft 
The aircraft involved was a Boeing 737-89P (737NG or 737 Next Generation) with the registration B-1791 and serial number 41474. The aircraft was powered by two CFM56-7B26E turbofan engines. It was first flown on 5 June 2015 and was delivered new to China Eastern Yunnan Airlines (subsidiary of China Eastern Airlines) on 25 June 2015. It was painted in the airline's Yunnan Peacock livery.

The 737-800 has a solid safety record, with 11 previous fatal accidents (the first in September 2006) out of more than 7,000 planes delivered since 1997. It is not equipped with the Maneuvering Characteristics Augmentation System (MCAS) used on the newer 737 MAX that led to two fatal accidents in 2018 and 2019 and the subsequent grounding of the fleet.

Passengers and crew 
The Civil Aviation Administration of China (CAAC) and the airline reported 123 passengers and 9 crew members to be on the flight, for a total of 132 people. All were Chinese.

The flight crew consisted of three pilots, five flight attendants and an in-flight security guard.
 32-year-old Captain Yang Hongda had been employed as a Boeing 737 pilot since January 2018, with a total of 6,709 flight hours.
 59-year-old First officer Zhang Zhengping was amongst China's most experienced commercial pilots, with 31,769 flight hours, and was a flight instructor for China Eastern, having trained more than 100 captains. He had been awarded the honorary title of "Meritorious Pilot" of civil aviation in 2011.
 27-year-old Second officer (as observer) Ni Gongtao, with a total of 556 flight hours, was aboard to fulfill training duties.

Emergency response and recovery
Local authorities dispatched 450 firefighters to the scene of the accident. Firefighters were dispatched by the Wuzhou Fire and Rescue Department at 15:05 CST. At 15:56, firefighters from nearby Tangbu arrived, and at 16:40, firefighters from outside Wuzhou were dispatched from Guilin, Beihai, Hezhou, Laibin and Hechi.

Rescue crews initially had difficulty accessing the site because of a forest fire which was extinguished by 17:25. By evening, 117 out of 650 dispatched rescuers were nearby and headed to the site from three directions. Aircraft wreckage and victims' belongings were found, but no signs of human remains were detected. Workers used hand equipment, detection dogs and UAVs to search for the flight recorders and human remains, finding one flight recorder on 23 March. The crash site was concentrated within a  radius where most of the wreck was found. Rescue workers found a  wreckage fragment, believed to be part of the aircraft,  from the main site.

Wet weather and the challenging accessibility of the crash site hampered the recovery process. Heavy rain partially filled the impact crater with water which had to be pumped away. Recovery activities were suspended on the morning of 23 March because of the threat of landslides. The remains of all 132 aircraft occupants were positively identified by 29 March. As of 31 March, at least 49,117 pieces of airplane wreckage had been recovered.

Investigation

Initial investigation

The CAAC enabled an emergency task force and dispatched a team to the crash site. Liu Ning, secretary of the Chinese Communist Party in Guangxi, visited the crash site and ordered an "all-out" search and rescue operation. He was accompanied by the director of Standing Committee of the People's Congress of Guangxi and other officials.

American agencies responded as representatives of the country where the aircraft was manufactured. The Federal Aviation Administration (FAA) said it was ready to assist in investigation efforts if requested. Boeing said that it was informed by initial reports and was gathering details. The National Transportation Safety Board (NTSB) said a senior official had been appointed as its representative to the inquiry. Representatives from CFM International, Boeing, and the FAA were assigned as technical advisers in the probe. United States Transportation secretary Pete Buttigieg said on 23 March that Chinese authorities had invited the NTSB to take part in the investigation. COVID-19 quarantine regulations may hamper access of U.S. investigators to mainland China. On 29 March 2022, the NTSB announced that China had granted visas to the agency and the technical advisors from Boeing, engine manufacturer CFM and the FAA.

The cockpit voice recorder (CVR) was found on 23 March with exterior damage although the internal storage device was believed to be relatively intact. It was sent to Beijing for data extraction. The emergency locator transmitter (ELT) was retrieved on 26 March, and on 27 March, the flight data recorder (FDR) was recovered. The two flight recorders were sent to a facility in Washington, D.C. for analysis. Concurrently, on April 1, a team of NTSB investigators left the United States for China.

Mao Yanfeng, head of aircraft investigation at the CAAC, stated the flight had not encountered dangerous weather conditions. No components of common explosives were detected. Chinese leadership called for open, timely and transparent publication of information about the crash. The CAAC published a preliminary report on April 20, 30 days after the accident. Soon after the accident, it was suggested that catastrophic failure of the tailplane (for example, a stabilizer problem) and sabotage (such as a pilot intentionally crashing) were two of the possibilities regarding the cause of the crash. However, Chinese authorities later confirmed that it was a winglet, whose loss should not severely impair airworthiness, and which is lightweight enough to either have flown to the ground in the wind or broke-up during the descent.

Preliminary report
On 20 April, CAAC released a preliminary report regarding the accident, stating that "there was no abnormality in the radio communication and control command between the crew and the air traffic control department before deviating from the cruise altitude." It was reported that the plane was airworthy, up to date on inspections, that all personnel met requirements, that weather was fine, and that no dangerous goods were found. Both aircraft recorders were severely damaged and were sent to Washington for further investigation.

Media reports of the investigation 
Early reports of the aircraft's flight data recorder pointed towards a deliberate crash from the cockpit. Flight controls were pushed to put the plane into a dive. This led the investigation toward the pilot or the possibility of a cockpit breach. China Eastern noted the unlikeliness of anyone breaching the cockpit, as an emergency code was not broadcast. Chinese authorities are not pointing to issues regarding mechanical or flight control problems.

On 17 May, The Wall Street Journal reported a source from the US government, from officials involved in the investigation, as saying that the plane had been intentionally crashed, based on an analysis of data from the aircraft recorders. News reports published by ABC News on the same day concurred with the Wall Street Journals report of the investigating officials in the US government declaring that the aircraft had been deliberately put into a vertical dive by a person on the flight deck, also citing flight recorder data showing that the landing gear and flaps had evidently not been engaged or deployed during the aircraft's descent which would indicate the pilots attempting an emergency descent or landing.

Multiple reports also mentioned that in the moments just before and during the descent, there were no distress or mayday calls from the cockpit to air traffic control nor any answers to the attempts from air traffic control and nearby aircraft to make contact with the aircraft. A video was released to the public on the day of the accident, showing the Boeing 737 aircraft involved entering a steep dive before slamming into a hilly area.

Reactions

Domestic 
Chinese premier Li Keqiang called for comprehensive efforts to search for survivors and treat the injured, emphasizing the need to reassure and serve the families of the victims. Chinese leader Xi Jinping called for investigators to determine the cause as soon as possible and to ensure "absolute" aviation safety. Over 1,000 psychology staff were dispatched to provide aid and emotional support to the families of the victims.

China Eastern established a hotline for family members and announced that its Boeing 737-800 fleet would be grounded for inspection until the investigation was completed. Most of the airline's 737-800s eventually returned to service in April 2022.

VariFlight reported that nearly 74 percent of the 11,800 flights scheduled in China on 22 March were cancelled as a result of the crash. A majority of flight services between Beijing and Shanghai were cancelled. Cancellation rates in China were the highest of 2022. Nearly 89 percent of all China Eastern flights were cancelled on 22 March.

News concerning the crash was heavily censored in China. State-run media focused on the emergency crews' response, including detailed lists of their equipment and provisions, and orders from Xi Jinping that officials do everything possible to find survivors. After officials initially failed to answer basic questions about the plane and its pilots, they were accused by online commentators of "rainbow farts," an idiom for excessive praise. Articles and social media posts that asked more detailed questions were deleted by censors. Faced with mounting pressure, officials eventually provided information on the maintenance history of the plane, the pilots' flight experience, and weather conditions at the time of the crash.

Within two hours of the crash 20 people claimed to have "survived" by not boarding the flight. Local media found only 2 of these claims to be genuine.

International 
A number of world leaders expressed condolences for the loss of life incurred.

In India, the Directorate General of Civil Aviation (DGCA) placed all Boeing 737 aircraft flown by Indian carriers under "enhanced surveillance." SpiceJet, Vistara and Air India Express have the aircraft in their fleets. An official from the regulatory body said that "safety is serious business" and that the situation was being closely monitored.

On U.S. stock markets, Boeing shares initially fell by 7.8 percent and China Eastern shares by 8.2 percent after the incident. On the Hong Kong Stock Exchange, China Eastern shares dropped by 6.5 percent.

Boeing offered its condolences to the families of the victims and said that it was in contact with China Eastern and the NTSB.

See also 

 List of accidents and incidents involving the Boeing 737

Notes

References

External links 
 Aerial view of crash site in Guangxi (5 photos)
 

2022 disasters in China
Accidents and incidents involving the Boeing 737 Next Generation
Aviation accidents and incidents in 2022
Aviation accidents and incidents in China
China Eastern Airlines accidents and incidents
History of Guangxi
March 2022 events in China
Wuzhou